William Savin Fulton (June 2, 1795 – August 15, 1844) was an American lawyer and politician who served as a United States Senator from Arkansas from 1836 until his death in 1844. He had previously served as the fourth governor of Arkansas Territory, from 1835 to 1836, and the second secretary of the Arkansas Territory from 1829 to 1835.

Early life 
Fulton was born in Cecil County, Maryland, and graduated from Baltimore College in 1813. He had intended to study law, but with the outbreak of the War of 1812 he enlisted in a company of volunteers at Fort McHenry. Fulton was military secretary to General Andrew Jackson during the Seminole War in 1818. After the war, Fulton moved to Gallatin, Tennessee, where he was admitted to the bar in 1817. He owned slaves.

Political career 
In 1820, Fulton settled in Florence, Alabama. In 1821, he was elected to the Legislature. He was appointed Secretary of the Arkansas Territory by President Andrew Jackson in 1829. Fulton served as Secretary until 1835, when he was appointed Governor of the Territory. When Arkansas was admitted as a state in 1836, he became one of its first Senators. In the United States Senate he became a member of the Democratic Party. Fulton remained a Senator until his death in 1844.

Death 
Fulton died at his home in Little Rock and was buried in the historic Mount Holly Cemetery in Little Rock.

Legacy 
Fulton County, Arkansas is named for him.

See also 
 List of governors of Arkansas
 List of United States Congress members who died in office (1790–1899)

References

External links 

 
 
 William S. Fulton at The Political Graveyard
 

1795 births
1844 deaths
People from Cecil County, Maryland
Jacksonian United States senators from Arkansas
Democratic Party United States senators from Arkansas
Governors of Arkansas Territory
Members of the Alabama Legislature
Alabama lawyers
Arkansas lawyers
Tennessee lawyers
American lawyers admitted to the practice of law by reading law
American slave owners
19th-century American newspaper editors
University of Maryland, Baltimore alumni
American militiamen in the War of 1812
American people of the Seminole Wars
Burials at Mount Holly Cemetery
United States senators who owned slaves